Mai Bakhtawar Lashari Shaheed (Sindhi: مائي بختاور لاشاري شهيد) was a farm worker who was murdered during a landlord/tenant confrontation. Her death helped prompt legal changes to improve the rights of farmers.

Early age
Bakhtawar was born in  1880 in the village of Dodo Khan Sarkani, near Roshan Abad, Taluka Tando Bago, Badin District, Sindh, in what was then British India. She was the only child of Murad Khan Lashari. In 1898, Bakhtawar married Wali Mohammad, a peasant working on the Ahmadi Estate. The couple had four children: Mohammad Khan, Lal Bukhsh, Mohammad Siddique and daughter Rasti.

Movement for peasants' rights

Before the Partition of India, the agricultural population in Sindh was divided in two classes. The landlords owned lands that had been awarded to them by the Hindu Raj  as political bribes,  The peasants worked the land, receiving a small reward for their labors. At the time of yield, the landlords would seize most of the yield, leaving a small amount of crop to the farmers.

Bakhtawar's village was the property of an Ahmadi who owned forty thousand acres of land, known as the “Ahmadi Estate”. An agrarian activist, Hyder Bux Jatoi, called for a conference of farmers to demand that they receive a half share of the yield. The Hari Conference in started in Judho on 22 June 1947.  Close to ten thousand farmers and workers went to conference, including all the men in Dodo Khan Sarkani.

Confrontation

On 22 June 1949, the last day of the Hari conference, the Ahmadi Muslims Qudiani decided to seize 1,20,000 kilograms of flour from Dodo Khan Sarkani while the village men were still absent. When the Ahmadi Muslims and their men arrived at the village, they were confronted by Bakhtawar, an old disabled man and other women. The villagers asked the Ahmadi Muslims to wait on taking the flour until the village men returned from the conference.

In a rage, Choudhry Saeedullah and his manager Choudhry Khalid ordered one their men to shoot Mai Bakhtawar was killed instantly . Her body was taken to town Samaro for postmortem rites and buried there.

Success after death
In 1950, a law was passed by the Government of Pakistan that forced landlords to have of the yield to the farmers.  Saeedullah, the nephew of then Pakistani foreign minister Muhammad Zafarullah Khan, and Khalid were sentenced to 20 years of imprisonment for killing of Mai Bakhtwar by Court.

Acknowledgements

Thar International Airport in islamkot was named after Mai Bakhtawar
First cadet college for girls in Shaheed Benazirabad was also named after Bakhtawar.
Government of Sindh has named Bakhtawar on concerned Union Council of Kunri Taluka
Two schools are also named after her. 
Government and non government organizations are awarding their best performance awards on the name of Mai Bakhatawar Lashari Shaheed''.

See also
 Rai Ahmad Khan Kharal
 Nizam Lohar
Hemu Kalani
Kadu Makrani
Ajab Khan Afridi
Bhagat Singh

References

1880 births
1947 deaths
Sindhi people
People from Badin District
Pakistani women activists
Pakistani activists
Pakistani farmers
Women farmers